Baneberry is a city in Jefferson County, Tennessee, United States. It is part of the Morristown, Tennessee Metropolitan Statistical Area. The population was 523 at the 2020 census. The community was named for native baneberry bushes near the original town site.

Geography
Baneberry is located at  (36.045912, -83.275804).

Demographics

2020 census

As of the 2020 United States census, there were 523 people, 236 households, and 187 families residing in the city.

2010 census
As of the census of 2010, there were 482 people living in the city; a 31.7% population increase since 2000 or 45.2% since 1990. The population density was 265 people per square mile (102/km). There were 249 housing units at an average density of 138.3 per square mile (52.9/km).

There were 204 households, of which 155 were family households and 49 were non-family households. Of the family households, 18.6% had children under the age of 18 living with them. 69.1% were a husband-wife family; 2.0% were male householders with no wife present, and 4.9% were female householders with no husband present. 24.0% of all households were made up of individual (non-family) households and 7.8% had someone living alone who was 65 years of age or older. The average household size was 2.36 and the average family size 2.70.

There were 246 females and 236 males. The overall median age was 54.1 years; females 53.8 years; males 54.4 years. 16.4% of the population was under age 18 and 23.9% over age 65. The remaining 59.7% were between 18 and 65 years of age.

Population by age was: 7.9% under 10 years of age; 10.4% from 10 to 19; 7.3% from 20 to 29; 7.5% from 30-39; 10.4% from 40-49; 19.5% from 50 to 59; 24.9% from 60 to 69; and 12.2% who were 70 years of age or older.

The racial makeup of the city was 96.9% White; 2.1% Hispanic; 0.4% African American; 0.4% two or more races; and 0.2% Native American.

The 2010 median income for a household in the city was $56,776. The per capita income for the city was $32,034. About 17.31% of families and 12.11% of the population were below the poverty line.

Economy
Baneberry is known locally and regionally as a resort community on the shores of Douglas Lake. Located in Baneberry is the Baneberry Golf and Resort, which features an 18-hole golf course, swimming pool, tennis courts, and the Baneberry Inn.

References

External links

Cities in Tennessee
Cities in Jefferson County, Tennessee
Morristown metropolitan area, Tennessee